300: March to Glory is a video game by American developer Collision Studios for the PlayStation Portable (PSP) the game that was released on February 27, 2007, based on the 1998 comic book mini-series 300 by Frank Miller and as well the 2006 movie of the same name.

Story 

This game begins shortly before the Battle of Thermopylae where players controls Leonidas, fighting through scenes from both the movie and comic franchise. Armour can be upgraded, as can weaponry and stats as rewards when players are done with levels to help on later ones. The player battles through hordes of Persian warriors including slaves, spearmen, archers, Immortals, Persian champions, two Persian generals, Mardonius and Hydarnes II. The action is furthered when the Spartan army forms a phalanx formation. This is used to fight not only even more Persians, but giant beasts such as elephants also. And as this game keeps progressing, Leonidas soon gains this ability to wield more than one sword and change between many weapon styles.

Reception 

The game received "mixed" reviews according to the review aggregation website Metacritic.

References

External links 

2007 video games
PlayStation Portable games
Battle of Thermopylae
Video games developed in the United States
Video games with historical settings
Video games set in Greece
PlayStation Portable-only games
Video games based on Dark Horse Comics films
Video games based on films
Adaptations of works by Frank Miller
Vicious Engine games
Warner Bros. video games
Video games set in antiquity
Cultural depictions of Leonidas I